

Incumbents
 President: Julio Argentino Roca

Governors
 Buenos Aires Province: Bernardo de Irigoyen 
 Cordoba: José Manuel Álvarez 
 Mendoza Province: Elías Villanueva

Vice Governors
 Buenos Aires Province: Alfredo Demarchi (until 1 May); Adolfo Saldías (starting 1 May)

Events
30 April - Cordillera of the Andes Boundary Case 1902 (Argentina, Chile): Commissioners receive the views of the inhabitants of the "Colonia del Valle 16 de Octubre".
28 May - Pacts of May: Chile and Argentina sign four protocols intended to improve relations and resolve territorial disputes.
29 December - The "Drago Doctrine" is put forward by Argentina's Foreign Minister Luis María Drago, stating that countries, including the USA, should not use armed force against other countries to collect debts arising from international loans. 
date unknown - The Paz Palace, Buenos Aires, is commissioned by José C. Paz, the proprietor of the city's then-second most-circulated newspaper, La Prensa.

Births
19 March - Manuel Seoane ("La Chancha"), footballer (died 1975)
22 April - Raquel Forner, Expressionist painter (died 1988) 
9 September - Roberto Noble, politician, journalist and publisher (died 1969) 
12 December - Juan Alberto Montes, surveyor and historian (died 1986)

Deaths
13 May - Zenón Rolón, Afro-Argentine musician (born 1856)
31 May - Rufina, daughter of Eugenio Cambaceres (born 1883; possible victim of premature burial)

See also
1902 in Argentine football

References

 
History of Argentina (1880–1916)
Years of the 20th century in Argentina